Tystrup Lake is a lake in Zealand.

See also

List of lakes in Denmark

References

Lakes of Zealand